Koçer is a Turkish surname. The origin of the word is Turkish. The word consists of "Koç for ram" and "er for man, soldier". So "Koçer" means the brave man or soldier.

 Guido Koçer, German-Turkish footballer
 Zeynep Gamze Koçer (born 1998), Turkish footballer

Turkish-language surnames